Huh Jung (born 1981) is a South Korean film director and screenwriter. Huh directorial debut - a low-budget horror-thriller Hide and Seek (2013) starring Son Hyun-joo, was an unexpected hit in 2013 with 5.6 million admissions. His second feature - also a horror film, titled The Mimic, stars actress Yum Jung-ah and is scheduled to release in 2017.

Filmography 
Goldfish (short film, 2004) - producer-director
Dancing Boy (short film, 2005) - actor
Let Me Free (short film, 2006) - cinematography dept
The Cursed (short film, 2010) - director, screenwriter
Rolling Home With a Bull (2010) - directing dept
The Wish (short film, 2012) - director, screenwriter
Moment (short film, 2012) - director
Big Good (2013) - actor, production sound mixer
Hide and Seek (2013) - director, screenwriter
The Mimic (2017) - director, screenwriter

Awards 
2013 33rd Korean Association of Film Critics Awards: Best New Director (Hide and Seek)

References

External links 
 
 
 

1981 births
Living people
South Korean film directors
South Korean screenwriters